The Portman 36 is an American sailboat that was first built in 1978.

Development and production
The silent partner in Auroraglas purchased the rights to the center-cockpit Coronado 35/Columbia 36 design from Columbia Yachts and the tooling was modified to become the aft-cockpit Portman 36. Other modifications included relocating the ports from the hull to a newly designed coach house and designing a new hull-to-deck joint.

The design was built by Auroraglas and later by Watkins Yachts in Clearwater, Florida, United States after the acquisition of Watkins and its merger with Auroraglas. A total of 19 boats were produced, with Auroraglas only building one or two of them, before production moved to Watkins.

The design was developed into the Watkins 36 and the Watkins 36C in 1981

Design
The Portman 36 is a recreational keelboat, built predominantly of fiberglass, with wood trim. It has a masthead sloop rig, a raked stem, a raised transom, a skeg-mounted spade-type/transom-hung rudder controlled by a wheel and a fixed fin keel. It displaces  and carries  of ballast.

The fuel tank holds .

Operational history
The boat is supported by an active class club, the Watkins Owners.

See also
List of sailing boat types

Related development
Watkins 36
Watkins 36C

Similar sailboats
Bayfield 36
Beneteau 361
C&C 36-1
C&C 36R
Catalina 36
Crealock 37
CS 36
Ericson 36
Frigate 36
Hinterhoeller F3
Hunter 36
Hunter 36-2
Hunter 36 Legend
Hunter 36 Vision
Invader 36
Islander 36
Nonsuch 36
S2 11.0
Seidelmann 37
Vancouver 36 (Harris)

References

Keelboats
1980s sailboat type designs
Sailing yachts
Sailboat types built by Watkins Yachts